Wanda Maria Chotomska (26 October 1929 – 2 August 2017) was a Polish children's writer, screenwriter and poet. She was born in Warsaw. She was notable for being the screenwriter of the Jacek i Agatka television series.

Poems
Her poems include: Wiersze pod psem (1959), Siedem księżyców (1970), Tańce polskie (1981), Kram z literami (1987), Wiersze dla dzieci (1997), and Wanda Chotomska dla najmłodszych (2000).

Death
Chotomska died in Warsaw on 2 August 2017 at the age of 87.

References

External links

 praca zbiorowa, "Złote Myśli Ludzi Wielkiego Umysłu, Talentu i Serca. Twórcy Wizerunku Polski", Fundacja Dzieciom "Zdążyć z Pomocą", Warszawa 2007

1929 births
2017 deaths
Polish television writers
Polish screenwriters
Polish women poets
Writers from Warsaw
Polish women children's writers
Polish women screenwriters
Recipient of the Meritorious Activist of Culture badge